Ram Ji Lal Suman (born 25 July 1950) is an Indian politician for the Firozabad in Uttar Pradesh.

References

External links
 Official biographical sketch in Parliament of India website

1950 births
Living people
People from Uttar Pradesh
People from Hathras
People from Agra
People from Firozabad district
India MPs 2004–2009
Samajwadi Party politicians
Janata Dal politicians
India MPs 1999–2004
India MPs 1989–1991
India MPs 1977–1979
Janata Party politicians
Bharatiya Lok Dal politicians
Samajwadi Party politicians from Uttar Pradesh